Alice Mayrine Backes (May 17, 1923 – March 15, 2007) was an American actress who performed on radio, television, and in films from the 1940s to the 1990s. Standing 5'9", she worked chiefly on television during her long career. She appeared in over 80 television series and made-for-television movies, specializing in character roles and dialects for scripts.

Early life
Alice Mayrine Backes was born in 1923 in Salt Lake City, Utah, the first daughter of Charles Cameron Backes and Lela Mayrine (née Maxwell) Backes, both natives of Montana.  According to the United States Census of 1940, 17-year-old Alice was still living that year with her parents in Salt Lake City, along with her two sisters, Lorraine and Virginia. The 1940 census further documents that her father was at that time a salesman of rock-wool insulation.

In Salt Lake City, Backes also attended the University of Utah, where she distinguished herself as a gifted violinist, earning a position as "concert mistress" in the university's symphony orchestra. After the attack on Pearl Harbor, she joined the WAVES, the women's branch of the United States Naval Reserve. She served stateside at WAVES "shore stations" working primarily as a jeep driver in and around Chicago and then San Francisco.

Career
Following the war, Backes moved to Hollywood, where by the late 1940s, she began finding steady employment as an actor. In 1948, she performed in an uncredited role as a Swedish immigrant girl in the film Up in Central Park. The bulk of her work, however, in this early stage of her career was as a voice-actor on radio. Between 1946 and 1950, she was a cast member on a variety of popular radio programs such as This is Your FBI, NBC University Theater, Dangerous Assignment, and Family Theater.

Backes continued performing regularly on radio for at least another six years, even after her increasing work on television had become her principal focus. Some of the other radio programs on which she played a variety of characters were The Whistler, The Halls of Ivy, Dragnet, Suspense, and Romance.

Television
During the 1950s, Backes appeared in over 20 television series, both in dramatic and comedic supporting roles. She secured her first two credited roles on television in 1952, as an office secretary on the series Gang Busters, in an episode titled "The Dennis Case"; and as Nurse Lenihan in "The Big Jump" on the televised version of Dragnet. Other television series in which Backes performed later in the 1950s include Mr. and Mrs. North, Medic, Dr. Hudson's Secret Journal, The Adventures of Ozzie and Harriet, Studio 57, Startime, Schlitz Playhouse of Stars, The Real McCoys, in 13 episodes of Bachelor Father, on Alfred Hitchcock Presents, Lux Video Theatre, M Squad, Hennesey, Law of the Plainsman, Leave It to Beaver, and Gunsmoke. In 1962, Backes appeared as Coralee Darby on the TV Western The Virginian in the episode titled "The Accomplice". 

Backes' career continued through the 1970s. In those decades, she either appeared for the first time or returned to perform in more than 60 sitcoms, Westerns, detective, courtroom, and medical shows, anthology series, suspense programs, and made-for-television movies. In the 1963 episode of The Andy Griffith Show, "Ernest T. Joins the Army", she played Olive, the widowed waitress working at Mayberry's diner.  In a memorable scene in that episode, Olive—after writing down Deputy Barney Fife's extensive breakfast order at the counter—clutches her notepad to her chest, beams with a motherly smile, and says to him, "It does my heart good to see a thin person eat."

While working as a notable "bit player" on some series in the 1960s and 1970s, Backes performed in more substantial roles as a supporting character in multiple episodes on other series such as The Rifleman (where her name was misspelled as Alice Backus), Wagon Train (S6E26’s “The Michael McGoo Story” as “Carrie”), The Detectives, The Alfred Hitchcock Hour, Hazel, Bewitched, Mayberry R.F.D., Here's Lucy, and Adam-12. In 1979, she also portrayed the character Kitty Rawlings in the NBC made-for-television movie The Best Place to Be, starring Donna Reed.

By the 1980s, she began to curtail her acting commitments, although she still appeared on Barnaby Jones, Barney Miller, Knight Rider, Mr. Belvedere, and a few other popular series in that decade. Nine years after her 1988 appearance on Mr. Belvedere, she made her last credited performance on television as Harriet Jenkins in an episode of Columbo, titled "A Trace of Murder".

Films
She was cast in no fewer than a dozen feature films, continuing to display in those roles her ability to play a wide range of characters, such as a telephone operator, prison nurse, a farmer's wife, dentist, teacher, a newspaper gossip columnist, and women in other occupations. Her films include the science-fiction comedy The Twonky (1953), I Want to Live! (1958), It Started with a Kiss (1959), That Touch of Mink (1962), The Glory Guys (1965), The Third Day (1965), Snowball Express (1972), The Man from Independence (1974), Half a House (1975), Gable and Lombard (1976), and The Cat From Outer Space (1978).

Charities and professional organizations
Outside of her acting assignments, Backes contributed her time and money to various charities, advocacy groups for children and wildlife welfare, and to professional organizations.  She promoted the work and served on boards and committees of the United Nation's International Children's Emergency Fund, Women's Institute for Freedom of the Press, Whidbey Animals' Improvement Foundation, the American Federation of Television and Radio Artists, the Screen Actors Guild (SAG), Theatre West, and Pioneer Broadcasters.  Backes was also a member of the Academy of Motion Picture Arts and Sciences; and in 2008, the year after her death, SAG formally recognized her contributions to the industry at the guild's televised 14th annual awards ceremony.

Personal life and death
Backes married only once, to Milton Citron, a native of New York, who was a Hollywood sound-effects specialist and editor for both film and television productions. The couple married in 1961 and remained together for over 20 years, until Milton's death in April 1983. They had no children. After her retirement from acting in the late 1990s, Backes continued to devote her time to charities and to her lifelong passion for music, studying the works of the classical masters, as well as Broadway scores and early choral compositions.

Backes remained in Los Angeles until 2006, when she relocated to Virginia Beach, Virginia, to be closer to family members. The following year, on March 15, Backes died in her sleep of natural causes at the age of 83. In accordance with her wishes and under arrangements made with the Neptune Society, her body was cremated, and her ashes were scattered in the Pacific Ocean.

Filmography

References

External links

1923 births
2007 deaths
American television actresses
American film actresses
American radio actresses
United States Navy sailors
WAVES personnel
20th-century American actresses
21st-century American women